The Max Velthuijs-prijs (Dutch for Max Velthuijs Prize) is a Dutch award awarded once every three years to an illustrator of a children's book. The award is not given for a particular work, but for the entire oeuvre. The award is named after Dutch painter, illustrator and writer Max Velthuijs (1923 – 2005).  The award is awarded by the Stichting P.C. Hooft-prijs voor Letterkunde which also awards the P.C. Hooft-prijs and Theo Thijssen-prijs. The award was established in 2006 and first awarded in 2007.

Winners 

 2007: Mance Post
 2010: Thé Tjong-Khing
 2013: Wim Hofman
 2016: Dick Bruna
 2019: Sylvia Weve
 2022: Philip Hopman

References

External links 
 

Children's literary awards
Dutch children's literature
Awards established in 2006
2006 establishments in the Netherlands
Lifetime achievement awards